Ivan Romanovych Rudskyi (born January 19, 1996), known online as EeOneGuy, is a Ukrainian web-based videoblogger and musician, best known for his Let's Play commentaries, comedy videos and vlogs on YouTube. Once the most popular YouTuber in Ukraine and Russia. After that he stopped being active on social media, sometimes appearing on different shows.

Early life
Ivan Rudskyi was born in Hannivka, Dnipropetrovsk Oblast on January 19, 1996. He was studying in school 127 in Kryvyi Rih.

Career 
Rudskyi created his YouTube channel on 19 March 2013, and began uploading on March 24, 2013.

At first, all his videos were filmed in Ukraine. Then he met his girlfriend and moved to Sapporo, Japan where he made a lot of content. In April 2017 he became the most popular Russian-speaking YouTuber.

In 2017 he left YouTube and social media to study in Warsaw and focus on beatmaking. In 2018 he signed the contract with a Russian YouTube network Yoola and the next year he released his first song in English. In the end of 2019 he released three songs with a new stage name AWEN. Since 2020 he started making videos for YouTube again as well as releasing new songs. He was using AWEN name for songs in English and EeOneGuy for songs in Russian.

After Russia invaded Ukraine in 2022 he started to make songs in Ukrainian, apparently cutting ties with Yoola label.

Filmography

Discography

As EeOneGuy

Singles

Music videos

As IVAN

Singles

As AWEN

Singles

Awards

References

External links 
 

Living people
People from Dnipropetrovsk Oblast
Ukrainian YouTubers
Russian YouTubers
1996 births
Music YouTubers
YouTube vloggers
Russian video bloggers